Karvinen is a Finnish surname. Notable people with the surname include:

 Eetu Karvinen (born 1993), Finnish ice hockey player
 Michelle Karvinen (born 1990), Danish-Finnish ice hockey player
 Shirly Karvinen (born 1993), Miss Finland 2016

Finnish-language surnames